Sheikh Said of Piran (1865 – June 29, 1925) was a Kurdish sheikh, the main leader of the Sheikh Said rebellion and a Sheikh of the Naqshbandi order.

He was born in 1865 in Palu to an influential family from the Naqshbandi order. He had five brothers. Still in his childhood, the family settled to Hınıs, Erzurum, where his grandfather was an influential Sheikh. Sheikh Said studied religious sciences at the madrasa led by his father Sheikh Mahmud Fevzi as well from several Islamic scholars in the region. Later he was involved in the local tekke set up by his grandfather Sheikh Ali. His grandfather was a respected leader of the religious community and his grave was visited by thousands of pilgrims. He became the head of the religious community after his father Sheikh Mahmud died. In 1907 he toured the neighboring provinces in the east and he established contacts with officers from the Hamidiye cavalry.

Civata Xweseriya Kurd (Society for Kurdish Independence) 

The Azadî (English: Freedom), officially Civata Azadiya Kurd (Society for Kurdish Freedom), later Civata Xweseriya Kurd (Society for Kurdish Independence) was a Kurdish secret organization.

In 1923, he was approached by Yusuf Zia Bey, who wanted him to join the Kurdish secret organization Azadî. He became the leader of the Azadî after Zia Bey and Halid Beg Cibran, the leader of the Azadî, were reportedly tipped off by the Yörük tribe and arrested. The Azadi was to become a leading force in the Sheikh Said Rebellion which began in February 1925 and starting from in Piran, soon spread as far as the surroundings of Diyarbakır. The Turkish army then opposed the rebellion and he was captured in mid-April 1925 after having been surrounded by the Turkish troops. He was condemned to death by the Independence Tribunal in Diyarbakır on the 28 June 1925 and hanged the next day in Diyarbakır with 47 of his followers. His remains were buried in an anonymous mass grave in order to prevent his memorization by the Kurds.

Family 
His first wife was Amine Hanim, who died during the Russian-Turkish war. His second wife was Fatma Hanim, a sister of Halit Beg Cibran, the leader of the Azadî.

His son Abdülhalik died after his deportation following the Sheikh Said rebellion. His grandson Abdülmelik Fırat became a deputy of the Grand National Assembly of Turkey. Fırat says that his ancestors were not involved in politics until his grandfather, for they had cordial relations with the Ottoman elite.

The actress Belçim Bilgin is his great-grandniece.

References

1865 births
1925 deaths
People from Hınıs
Turkish Sunni Muslims
Sheikh Said rebellion
Kurdish nationalists
Executed Turkish people
People executed by Turkey by hanging
People executed for treason against Turkey
20th-century executions for treason
20th-century executions by Turkey
Kurdish Sufi religious leaders